Dodgem Logic was a bimonthly underground magazine edited and published by Alan Moore, that published eight issues from January 2010 to April 2011. Each issue featured comics, stories, and articles by Moore, including the regular feature "Great Hipsters in History".  The general tone of the magazine was irreverent and subversive, after the manner of The East Village Other and the National Lampoon.  Regular artists and writers included Dave Hamilton, Kevin O'Neill, Steve Aylett, Josie Long and LeJorne Pindling.

The first issue included a CD titled "Nation of Saints, 50 Years of Northampton music. Included with the second issue, as an insert, was an eight page Alan Moore comic book, "Astounding Weird Penises".

According to Cory Doctorow, "The mere fact that the Great Bearded Wizard of Albion, Mr Alan Moore, is behind a new journal, Dodgem Logic, should be enough to get a lot of us interested. But add in talents like the Josie Long, Graham Linehan, Kev O'Neill, Melinda Gebbie, Steve Aylett and others and I'm pretty much sold and I'd imagine so are most of us." And Wired magazine describes Dodgem Logic as "an engaging, educational and often hilarious read".

References

External links 
Dodgem Logic

2010 establishments in the United Kingdom
2011 establishments in the United Kingdom
Bi-monthly magazines published in the United Kingdom
Satirical magazines published in the United Kingdom
Black comedy
Defunct magazines published in the United Kingdom
English-language magazines
Magazines established in 2010
Magazines disestablished in 2011
Underground comix